Bernard Dematteis (born 24 May 1986) is an Italian male mountain runner and sky runner, two times senior individual European champion at European Mountain Running Championships.

Biography
He won 10 medals from 2008 to 2016 at the World Mountain Running Championships (all with the national team) and 14 (five of these at individual level, including two gold medals) at the European Mountain Running Championships.

His twin brother Martin Dematteis is also a mountain runner.

Achievements

National titles
Italian Mountain Running Championships
Mountain running: 2008, 2012, 2013, 2014, 2016, 2018 (6)
Italian Long Distance Mountain Running Championships
Long distance mountain running: 2015
Italian Vertical Kilometer Championships
Vertical kilometer: 2012, 2013 (2)

See also
 Italy at the World Mountain Running Championships
 Italy at the European Mountain Running Championships

References

External links
 

1986 births
Living people
Italian male mountain runners
Italian male long-distance runners
Italian sky runners
Italian twins
Twin sportspeople
People from Sampeyre
21st-century Italian people